386th may refer to:

386th Air Expeditionary Wing, provisional United States Air Force unit assigned to United States Air Forces Central
386th Fighter Squadron or 174th Air Refueling Squadron, unit of the Iowa Air National Guard 185th Air Refueling Wing
386th Infantry Division (Germany) or 3rd Infantry Division (Wehrmacht), established under the cover name Wehrgauleitung Frankfurt in 1934
386th Tactical Fighter Squadron, inactive United States Air Force unit

See also
386 (number)
386 (disambiguation)
386, the year 386 (CCCLXXXVI) of the Julian calendar
386 BC